The 2009 National Football Challenge Cup was the 19th edition of National Football Challenge Cup. The tournament was hosted by Hyderabad. The tournament started on 18 April and concluded on 28 April.

Pakistan Navy were the defending champions, they were eliminated in the semi-finals by the eventual winners Khan Research Laboratories, who won their first major trophy since establishment.

Group stage

Group A

Group B

Group C

Group D

Knockout round

Quarter-finals

Semi-finals

Third place match

Final

References

Pakistan National Football Challenge Cup
Cup